The Old Rochester Regional School District and Superintendency Union # 55 serve the towns of Marion, Mattapoisett and Rochester in Plymouth County, Massachusetts. The three communities have a combined year round population of just over 15,000. The communities are located in the southeast corner of Massachusetts within  of both Boston and Providence and within  of the Cape Cod Canal. This location provides easy access to numerous cultural, recreational and educational resources.

Schools
Currently, the district serves in excess of 2,700 students. Through the organizational structure of four school committees, the district operates six schools:

 Sippican Elementary School, Marion
 Center School, Mattapoisett
 Old Hammondtown Elementary School,  Mattapoisett
 Old Rochester Regional High School, Mattapoisett
 Old Rochester Regional Junior High School, Mattapoisett
 Rochester Memorial Elementary School, Rochester

Schools not Managed by ORR
Students in Rochester or Mattapoisett may attend Old Colony Regional Vocational Technical High School, while students in Marion may attend Upper Cape Cod Regional Technical High School.

References

External links 
 
http://sippican.oldrochester.org/pages/Sippican_School 
http://center.oldrochester.org/pages/Center 
http://ohs.oldrochester.org/pages/Old_Hammondtown_School 
http://hs.oldrochester.org/pages/ORRHS 
http://jhs.oldrochester.org/pages/JHS 
http://rms.oldrochester.org/pages/Rochester_Memorial 

School districts in Massachusetts
Education in Plymouth County, Massachusetts